The Markhus Tunnel is a road tunnel in Etne municipality in Vestland county, Norway. The tunnel was opened in 1995 to replace a narrow, winding road that goes through a small residential area. The tunnel gave a wider, straighter road that meets official standards for highways.

References

Etne
Road tunnels in Vestland